Anna Ivanovna Malukhina (born 21 December 1958) is a former Soviet sport shooter. She won a bronze medal in the 10 metre air rifle event at the 1988 Summer Olympics in Seoul.

References

1958 births
Olympic shooters of the Soviet Union
Olympic shooters of the Unified Team
Olympic shooters of Russia
Shooters at the 1988 Summer Olympics
Shooters at the 1992 Summer Olympics
Shooters at the 1996 Summer Olympics
Olympic bronze medalists for the Soviet Union
Olympic medalists in shooting
Medalists at the 1988 Summer Olympics
Living people
Sportspeople from Moscow
Olympic silver medalists for the Soviet Union